Fred Bradshaw is a Canadian politician. He was elected to represent the electoral district of Carrot River Valley in the Legislative Assembly of Saskatchewan in the 2007 election. Born in Arborfield, Saskatchewan, he is a member of the Saskatchewan Party. On January 4, 2021, he was named Minister of Highways, after the resignation of Joe Hargrave. He was shuffled out of cabinet on May 31, 2022.

Electoral history

2016 Saskatchewan general election

2011 Saskatchewan general election

2007 Saskatchewan general election

Cabinet positions

References

Saskatchewan Party MLAs
Living people
1951 births
21st-century Canadian politicians